There has been one baronetcy granted to the Lauder family.  The baronetcy of Lauder of Fountainhall, Haddingtonshire, was created for John Lauder, last surviving male representative of the Lauders of that Ilk, a rich merchant-burgess and sometime Treasurer and baillie of the City of Edinburgh, and an armiger. He purchased (before 1672) the estate of Newington, Edinburgh, and subsequently (10 June 1681) the lands of Woodhead and Templehall near Pencaitland, which along with others in Edinburghshire and Haddingtonshire, were erected by Crown charter into the feudal barony of Fountainhall on 13 August 1681.

John Lauder was created a baronet in the Baronetage of Nova Scotia on 17 July 1688.<ref>Brown, Peter, publisher, The Peerage of Scotland", Edinburgh, 1834: 218</ref> The first Letters Patent was successfully contested by his eldest surviving son, Lord Fountainhall, and "reduced", and a second Patent with a new destination issued, dated 25 January 1690; the first Patent was formally annulled in 1692.

Lauder baronets of Fountainhall, Haddingtonshire

Sir John Lauder, 1st Baronet (died 1692)
Sir John Lauder, Lord Fountainhall, 2nd Baronet (1646–1722)
Sir John Lauder, 3rd Baronet (1669–1728)
Sir Alexander Lauder, 4th Baronet (1698–1730)
Sir Andrew Lauder, 5th Baronet (1702–1769)
Sir Andrew Dick-Lauder, 6th Baronet (1743-1820) 
Sir Thomas Dick Lauder, 7th Baronet (1784–1848)
Sir John Dick-Lauder, 8th Baronet (1813–1867)
Sir Thomas North Dick-Lauder, 9th Baronet (1846–1919)
Sir George William Dalrymple Dick-Lauder, 10th Baronet (1852–1936)
Sir John North Dalrymple Dick-Lauder, 11th Baronet (1883–1958)
Sir George Dick-Lauder, 12th Baronet (17 November 1917 – 11 August 1981)
Sir Piers Robert Dick Lauder, 13th Baronet, born 3 October 1947 at Nicosia, Cyprus, where his father was an officer serving in the British Army. From 1974 until 2006, Lauder (who only uses the surname Lauder) was a programmer and Computer Systems Officer in the Basser Department of Computer Science at Sydney University, New South Wales, Australia. His main interests are in the areas of networking and operating systems. With Judy Kay he co-authored the Fair Share Scheduler, now being sold by Aurema under the name "ARMTechShareExpress". With Professor Robert (Bob) Kummerfeld he co-authored the Message Handling Systems network ("MHSnet") used, amongst others, by the Australian Department of Foreign Affairs and Trade. Professor Kummerfeld and Piers Lauder were jointly elected to the Australian Internet Hall of Fame in 1998. Sir Piers Lauder is a founding member of AUUG, the Australian Unix and Open Systems User Group. He has twice been appointed Programme Chairman at AUUG Conferences in Sydney and has taken leave from the university to work overseas on three separate occasions, twice at the invitation of Bell Laboratories to work in the lab that originated UNIX, and once at the invitation of UUNET to work in the burgeoning ISP business. He is an enthusiastic proponent of the Python programming language. He has, by his partner Jane Elix (b. 1960, d. 2012), a natural child, Angus Thomas Lauder Elix (born 1996). They also have a foster-daughter, Akira Crease. By coincidence, the great-great-grandmother of Sir Harry Lauder was Janet, daughter of William Crease.

The heir presumptive to the baronetcy is Mark Andrew Dick Lauder (born 1951), second and youngest son of the 12th Baronet.  He was born in Berlin at the British Military Hospital.

His heir apparent is his only son, Martin Dick-Lauder (born 1976).

Dick-Lauder coat of arms

Shield
Quarterly: for Lauder (Lord Fountainhall's Arms of 1699), 1st and 4th: Gules, a griffin rampant within a bordure, Argent; and for Dick, 2nd and 3rd Argent, a fesse, wavy, Azure, between three mullets, Gules.

Crests
1st (for Lauder), a tower, with portcullis down, and the head and shoulders of a sentinel appearing above the battlements, in a watching posture, Proper; 2nd (for Dick) A stag's head, erased, Proper, attired, Or.

Supporters
Two lions rampant, Argent

Motto of the arms
Ut migraturus habita

Mottos of the crests
(Lauder) Turris prudentia custos
(Dick) Virtute

References

Notes

 The Royal Families of England, Scotland, and Wales, with their Descendants, etc., by Messrs, John and John Bernard Burke, London, 1851, vol.2, pedigree CLXXIII.
 Monumental Inscriptions in Greyfriars Churchyard, by James Brown, Edinburgh, 1864, pps: 301 - 302, gives the burial vault within the church of the family of Lauder of Lauder, and all who are contained therein.
 The Peerage & Baronetage of the British Empire by Sir Bernard Burke, London, 32nd edition, 1870, under 'Lauder', pps:662-3.
 Townend, Peter, Burke's Peerage, Baronetage, & Knightage, 105th edition, London, 1970, p. 1545.
 Mosley, Charles, Burke's Peerage & Baronetage'', 106th edition, Crans, Switzerland, 1999, p. 843, 

Baronetcies in the Baronetage of Nova Scotia
1688 establishments in Nova Scotia